The governor of the Reserve Bank of India is the chief executive officer of India's central bank and the ex-officio chair of its Central Board of Directors. Indian Rupee currency notes, issued by the Reserve Bank of India, bear the governor's signature. Since its establishment in 1935 by the government of India, the RBI has been headed by twenty-fivegovernors. The governor of the Reserve Bank of India is a member of the Strategic Policy Group headed by National Security Advisor Ajit Doval. It is a crucial wing of the National Security Council.

The term of office typically runs for three years and can, in some cases, be extended for another two years.

The inaugural officeholder was the British banker Sir Osborne Smith, while Sir C. D. Deshmukh was the first native Indian governor. Holding office for over seven years, Sir Benegal Rama Rau was the longest-serving governor, while Amitav Ghosh's 20-day term is the shortest. The bank's fifteenthgovernor, Dr Manmohan Singh, later became India's thirteenth prime minister. Shaktikanta Das is the twenty-fifth governor of the Reserve Bank of India from 12 December 2018.

List of governors

References

External links
 

Governors of the Reserve Bank of India
Lists of office-holders in India
Lists of central bankers